Christopher T. Harvey (born December 8, 1967) is an American former professional ice hockey goaltender who was an All-American for Brown.

Career
Harvey was a four-year starter for Brown, twice being named team MVP. after his first MVP honor, he was selected by the Boston Bruins in the NHL Supplemental Draft, being 21 years old at the time. Brown went through a dreadful season while Harvey was a junior, with the team winning just one game. Both he and the team rebounded in 1990 and Harvey was named as an All-American for the vast improvement.

After graduating, Harvey began his professional career. He spent the bulk of his time in the ECHL andretired as a player in 1994.

Harvey was inducted into the Brown Athletic Hall of Fame in 1997.

Statistics

Regular season and playoffs

Awards and honors

References

External links

1967 births
Living people
AHCA Division I men's ice hockey All-Americans
American men's ice hockey goaltenders
Ice hockey players from Massachusetts
Sportspeople from Cambridge, Massachusetts
Brown Bears men's ice hockey players
Maine Mariners players
Johnstown Chiefs players
Nashville Knights players
Raleigh IceCaps players
Erie Panthers players
Brantford Smoke players
Boston Bruins draft picks
National Hockey League supplemental draft picks